Endri Hasa (born in Elbasan, on 16 February 1981) is an Albanian conservative politician, member of the presidency of the Democratic Party of Albania that was member of the Assembly of the Republic of Albania for the Democratic Party of Albania (DP). He became member of the Presidency of the Democratic Party of Albania as Head of the Information Society Department in November 2014 and was re-elected in January 2019.

Education
Endri has a degree in electronics engineering from the University of Florence and has successfully completed his postgraduate studies at the University of Sheffield.

References

Members of the Parliament of Albania
Alumni of the University of Sheffield
Democratic Party of Albania politicians
People from Elbasan
1981 births
Living people